The Georgia State Panthers college football team represents Georgia State University in the Sun Belt Conference (SBC). The Panthers compete as part of the National Collegiate Athletic Association (NCAA) Division I Football Bowl Subdivision. The school has had 3 head coaches since it began play during the 2010 season. Since December 2016, Shawn Elliott has served as Georgia State's head coach.

Key

Coaches

References

Key

Georgia State

Georgia State Panthers football coaches